Dunavant is a surname. Notable people with the surname include:

D. Michael Dunavant (born 1970), American lawyer
Leonard Dunavant (1919–1995), American businessman and politician
William Dunavant (born 1932), American industrialist

English-language surnames